A Dangerous Adventure (Spanish: Una aventura peligrosa) is a 1939 Cuban film directed by Ramón Peón and starring Rosita Fornés.

Cast
 Juan Bux 
 Aníbal de Mar as Pancrasio  
 Xiomara Fernandez 
 Rosita Fornés 
 Julio Gallo 
 Ramiro Gómez Kemp 
 Sergio Miro

References

Bibliography 
 Alfonso J. García Osuna. The Cuban Filmography: 1897 through 2001. McFarland, 2003.

External links 
 

1939 films
1930s Spanish-language films
Films directed by Ramón Peón
Cuban black-and-white films